The 2019 Dudley Metropolitan Borough Council election took place on 2 May 2019 to elect members of Dudley Metropolitan Borough Council in England. This was on the same day as other local elections.

Results summary

Ward results

Amblecote

Belle Vale

Brierley Hill

Brockmoor & Pensnett

Castle & Priory

Coseley East

Cradley & Wollescote

Gornal

Halesowen North

Halesowen South

Hayley Green & Cradley South

Kingswinford North & Wall

Kingswinford South

Lye & Stourbridge North

Netherton, Woodside & St. Andrew's

Norton

Pedmore & Stourbridge

Quarry Bank & Dudley Wood

Sedgley

St. James's

St. Thomas

Upper Gornal & Woodsetton

Wollaston & Stourbridge Town

Wordsley

References

2019 English local elections
2019
2010s in the West Midlands (county)